Luyten 726-8, also known as Gliese 65, is a binary star system that is one of Earth's nearest neighbors, at about 8.7 light years from Earth in the constellation Cetus. The two component stars are both flare stars with the variable star designations BL Ceti and UV Ceti.

Star system 

The star system was discovered in 1948 by Willem Jacob Luyten in the course of compiling a catalog of stars of high proper motion; he noted its exceptionally high proper motion of 3.37 arc seconds annually and cataloged it as Luyten . The two stars are of nearly equal brightness, with visual magnitudes of 12.7 and 13.2 as seen from Earth. They orbit one another every 26.5 years. If  km/s then approximately 28,700 years ago Luyten 726-8 was at its minimal distance of 2.21 pc (7.2 ly) from the Sun.

Luyten-726-8A was later found to be a variable star and given the variable star designation BL Ceti. It is a red dwarf of spectral type M5.5V. It is also a flare star, and classified as a UV Ceti variable type, but it is not nearly as remarkable or extreme in its behavior as its companion star UV Ceti.

Soon after the discovery of Luyten 726-8A, the companion star Luyten 726-8B was discovered. Like Luyten 726-8A, this star was also found to be variable and given the variable star designation UV Ceti. Although UV Ceti was not the first flare star discovered, it is the most prominent example of such a star, so similar flare stars are now classified as UV Ceti type variable stars. This star goes through fairly extreme changes of brightness: for instance, in 1952, its brightness increased by 75 times in only 20 seconds. UV Ceti is a red dwarf of spectral type M6V.

Both stars are listed as spectral standard stars for their respective classes, being considered typical examples of the classes.

In approximately 31,500 years, Luyten 726-8 will have a close encounter with Epsilon Eridani at the minimal distance of about 0.93 ly. Luyten 726-8 can penetrate a conjectured Oort cloud about Epsilon Eridani, which may gravitationally perturb some long-period comets. The duration of mutual transit of two star systems within 1 ly from each other is about 4,600 years.

Luyten 726-8 is a possible member of the Hyades Stream.

See also 
 List of nearest stars and brown dwarfs

References

Notes

Further reading

External links 
 http://www.aavso.org/vstar/vsots/fall03.shtml 
 http://www.solstation.com/stars/luy726-8.htm

M-type main-sequence stars
BY Draconis variables
Ceti, UV
Binary stars
Hyades Stream
Local Bubble

Cetus (constellation)
0065
Ceti, BL UV